Jacob Daniel Tierney (born September 26, 1979) is a Canadian actor, director, screenwriter, and producer. He is best known for playing Eric in Are You Afraid of the Dark? (1990–1992) and as the co-writer, director, and executive producer of the sitcom Letterkenny (2016–2021), in which he also plays Pastor Glen.

Early life
Jacob Daniel Tierney was born in Montreal on September 26, 1979, the son of teacher Terry (née Smiley) and film producer Kevin Tierney (1950–2018). He is of Irish and Jewish descent. His younger sister, Brigid, is an actress.

Career
Tierney started his career as a child actor, beginning at age six. Aside from acting, Tierney also writes and directs. He made his directorial debut in 2002 with his short film titled Dad.

Since Dad, Tierney has written and directed the feature films Twist (2003), for which he was nominated for a Genie Award for Best Adapted Screenplay, The Trotsky (2009), which garnered him two Canadian Comedy Awards and a Genie Award, Good Neighbours (2010), and Preggoland (2014). He has also directed episodes of the television sitcom Mr. D and Gavin Crawford's comedy special Gavin Crawford's Wild West. In 2012, Tierney participated in the jury of the Air Canada enRoute Film Festival.

Tierney made his stage directing debut in 2015 with a production of Travesties by Tom Stoppard at the Segal Centre in Montreal. In 2017, he returned to the Segal Centre to direct Noises Off by Michael Frayn.

Tierney is the co-writer, director, and executive producer of the sitcom Letterkenny, in which he also stars as Pastor Glen. At the 5th Canadian Screen Awards in 2017, Tierney won several awards for his work on the series, including the Canadian Screen Award for Best Comedy Series. In 2018, Tierney won the Canadian Screen Awards for Best Direction in a Comedy Series, as well as Best Writing in a Comedy Series alongside Letterkenny creator and star Jared Keeso.

Filmography

Awards and nominations

References

External links

1979 births
Living people
Anglophone Quebec people
Canadian male film actors
Canadian male screenwriters
Canadian male television actors
Canadian male voice actors
Canadian people of Irish descent
Quebec people of Irish descent
Jewish Canadian male actors
Best Original Song Genie and Canadian Screen Award winners
Male actors from Montreal
Best Screenplay Genie and Canadian Screen Award winners
Canadian television directors
Canadian male child actors
20th-century Canadian male actors
21st-century Canadian male actors
Writers from Montreal
Film directors from Montreal
Canadian Comedy Award winners
21st-century Canadian screenwriters
21st-century Canadian male writers